Coptis trifolia, commonly known as the threeleaf goldthread or savoyane, is a perennial plant in the genus Coptis, a member of the family Ranunculaceae.

Distribution 
It is native to North America and Asia across the subarctic region. Its range is divided into three broad groups. The first is from southern Greenland and Labrador that extends to Manitoba to the west and to the mountains of North Carolina to the south. The second is in Alaska and adjacent areas of British Columbia, extending towards eastern Siberia and into Japan and Manchuria. It is also found in Norway and central Russia. The disrupted and wide range of the species suggests that the three populations have been isolated from each other for significant periods of time.

Goldthread seems to prefer coniferous or mixed canopies dominated by Eastern hemlock, but it has also been found in deciduous canopies in moist, acidic soils.

Description 
Goldthread has at least one small, deeply three-lobed, evergreen leaf rising from the ground. It has between four and seven white, petaloid sepals, though no true petals. It has between four and seven clavate and numerous stamen. It is usually between five and fifteen centimeters tall, with each stalk having a single flower or three leaflets. Its fruits contain a number of small seeds. The name goldthread is derived from the plant's bright yellow rhizome.

Medicinal uses 
The rhizome of the plant was chewed by Native Americans, including Algonquian-speaking peoples and the Iroquois, to relieve canker sores, and is the source of another common name, canker-root. It has also been used to make a tea that is used as an eyewash. Like the medicinal plant goldenseal, goldthread is used to treat symptoms of influenza and the common cold. Coptis trifolia has been shown to be biologically active against E.coli and Bacillus subtilis. The active compounds of Coptis trifolia are the alkaloids berberine and coptine.

Ecology 
In 1963, a species of fungus in the genus Lambertella, Lambertella copticola, was discovered growing on the dead leaves of a Coptis trifolia. 

Species of the fungal genus Gloeosporium can infect Coptis trifolia, as well as other species of Coptis, and reduce normal plant function. The slug Arion fasciatus also feeds on goldthread. Other external threats to Coptis trifolia include logging, fire, agricultural development, and human recreation.

Gallery

References

External links
 rook.org
 Coptis trifolia Image - Flavon's art gallery
 Lady Bird Johnson Wildflower Center

trifolia